Chrysomyxa ledi is a fungus. It occurs in Eurasia throughout the range of its broad-leaved hosts. The aecial stage is found on native and exotic spruces in Europe, including white and Engelmann spruces.

References

Fungal plant pathogens and diseases
ledi